Ulang is a county in Upper Nile State, South Sudan. The county border Nasir to the North and Akobo to the south. As in most other parts of South Sudan, Ulang lacks infrastructure. During decades of civil war, the countryside has been ravaged. Many people fled to refugee camps, and many failed to obtain an education. Skilled labor is in short supply. The economy is based on subsistence agriculture, with unpredictable yields. Over the last two years, Ulang has gained relative stability due to the new county commissioner's initiative, which focuses on reconciling various Ulang communities through reconciliation conferences.

References

Upper Nile (state)
Counties of South Sudan